Chris Lillywhite (born 15 June 1966) is an English competitive cyclist from East Molesey, Surrey.

Cycling career
He won the Milk Race in 1993, and has competed on the continent. He was a professional rider between 1987 and 1999. Lillywhite represented England at the 1984, 1994 and 1998 Commonwealth Games; he was disqualified from medal contention when it was found he illegally took hold of Australian competitor, Grant Rice's riding shorts and pulled him back on the sprint to the finishing line in the men's road race in Victoria Canada, 1994.

Palmarès

1983
3rd National junior road race series
1984
1st National junior road race series
1986
7th Milk Race

1987
2nd British National Circuit Race Championships
11th FBD Milk Ras

1988
3rd British National Road Race Championships

1989
3rd British National Circuit Race Championships

1990
3rd Grand Prix of Wales
8th Herald Sun Tour
1st Stage 3, Herald Sun Tour
1st Stage 12, Herald Sun Tour

1992
1st Stage 5, Milk Race

1993
1st Milk Race
1st British National Circuit Race Championships
4th British National Road Race Championships
2nd Overall, Premier Calendar series

1994
1st Tom Simpson Memorial RR
3rd Overall, Premier Calendar series
4th Commonwealth Games Road Race

1995
3rd British National Road Race Championships
3rd British National Circuit Race Championships
2nd Commonwealth Bank Classic
1st Stage 6, Commonwealth Bank Classic
3rd Overall, Premier Calendar series
1st Tour of Lancashire
1st Stage 3, Tour of Lancashire
1st Thwaites Grand Prix

1996
1st Stage 5, Tour de la Suisse Orientale
3rd Overall, Premier Calendar series

1997
1st Tom Simpson Memorial RR
4th Commonwealth Bank Classic
1st Stage 2, Commonwealth Bank Classic

1998
1st Lincoln International GP

1999
1st King of the Mountains, Five Valleys Road Race
2nd Stage 4, VicHealth Herald Sun Tour
3rd Stage 2, East Riding of Yorkshire Classic
3rd Five Valleys Road Race
3rd British National Circuit Race Championships
4th Lancaster - Hertford Grand Prix
5th Stage 4, Tour of Slovenia

References

1966 births
Living people
English male cyclists
Cyclists at the 1986 Commonwealth Games
Cyclists at the 1994 Commonwealth Games
Cyclists at the 1998 Commonwealth Games
Commonwealth Games competitors for England
People from Molesey